Luna 13 (E-6M series) was an unmanned space mission of the Luna program.

Overview
The Luna 13 spacecraft was launched toward the Moon from an Earth-orbiting platform and accomplished a soft landing on 24 December 1966, in the region of Oceanus Procellarum ("Ocean of Storms").

The petal encasement of the spacecraft was opened, antennas were erected, and radio transmissions to Earth began four minutes after the landing. On 25 and 26 December 1966, the spacecraft television system transmitted panoramas of the nearby lunar landscape at different Sun angles. Each panorama required approximately 100 minutes to transmit. The spacecraft was equipped with a mechanical soil-measuring penetrometer, a dynamograph, and a radiation densitometer for obtaining data on the mechanical and physical properties and the cosmic ray reflectivity of the lunar surface. Transmissions from the spacecraft ceased on 28 December 1966.

Luna 13 became the third spacecraft to land successfully on the surface of the Moon (after Luna 9 and the American Surveyor 1). The probe landed in the Ocean of Storms at 18:01 UT on 24 December 1966, between the Krafft and Seleucus craters at 18°52' north latitude and 62°3' west longitude. Unlike its predecessor, the heavier Luna 13 lander (113 kilograms) carried a suite of scientific instruments in addition to the usual imaging system.

A pair of spring-loaded booms were also deployed. One of these booms carried a penetrometer, designed to measure the forces required to penetrate the lunar regolith – the penetrating force being supplied by a minute explosive charge. The other boom carried a backscatter densitometer that was used to infer the density of the lunar near-surface regolith. Four radiometers recorded infrared radiation from the surface indicating a noon temperature of 117 ±3 °C while a radiation detector indicated that radiation levels would be less than hazardous for humans.

The lander returned a total of five panoramas of the lunar surface, showing a more smooth terrain than seen by Luna 9. One of the two cameras (intended to return stereo images) failed, but this did not diminish the quality of the photographs. The penetrometer measured the regolith density at 800Kg/m3.

After a fully successful mission, contact was lost at 06:13 UTC on 28 December when the on-board batteries were exhausted.

See also
 List of artificial objects on the Moon

References

External links

 Zarya - Luna 13 chronology
 Soviet Lunar Images
 Luna-13 sends photographs of Moon (An archived news report dated 26 December 1966)

Luna programme
Spacecraft launched in 1966
1966 in the Soviet Union
Spacecraft launched by Molniya-M rockets
Soft landings on the Moon
1966 on the Moon